Akjemal Magtymova is a Turkmen physician, working in the field of public health and development as an international civil servant with the United Nations.

Education 

Magtymova is a medical doctor specializing in Obstetrics and Gynecology from the Turkmen State Medical University. She holds a Master of Science degree in Health Systems Management from London School of Hygiene & Tropical Medicine and Master of Arts in International Relations from the Fletcher School of Law and Diplomacy, Tufts University, along with certificates for continuous education in public health and management from various institutions including from Johns Hopkins Bloomberg School of Public Health.

Career

Early professional years 
Magtymova dedicated her early professional years to clinical practice and epidemiological research in maternal and reproductive health with a Clinical Research Center of Mother and Child HealthCare in Turkmenistan, her home country.

The United Nations 
Magtymova has been with the United Nations since 1998, working with the United Nations Population Fund and the World Health Organization in the South-East Asia and the Eastern Mediterranean Regions. Magtymova’s professional trajectory focuses on planning, implementation and evaluation of development and humanitarian assistance programmes, with active contribution to the development of WHO-led technical guidelines, researches, reports and authored/co-authored a number of national and regional level publications.

Responsibilities 
Magtymova has assumed increasing level of responsibilities throughout her career, which include provision of technical, policy and strategic advice to Ministries of Health in the reform context leading multi-stakeholder policy dialogue for equitable health financing strategies with a focus on universal health coverage people-centered primary health care and health in all policies.7

Achievements 
Magtymova’s track record of resource mobilization includes, among others, a single grant of $76 million for health and nutrition for Yemen (2016), $9 million for low emission climate resilience for Maldives (2014), $20 million for maternal and child health for DPR Korea (2006). Her managerial and leadership experience ranges from development to humanitarian and complex emergency contexts involving supervision of large teams as WHO Representative as well as acting UN Resident Coordinator and Designated Official.

References 

The Fletcher School at Tufts University alumni
Living people
1968 births
Johns Hopkins Bloomberg School of Public Health alumni
Turkmenistan officials of the United Nations
Turkmen State Medical University alumni
20th-century women physicians
21st-century women physicians
Corruption in Syria
United Nations experts
World Health Organization officials